The Chicago Maroons football program is a college football team that represents University of Chicago in the University Athletic Association, a part of the NCAA Division III.  The team has had 12 head coaches since its first recorded football game in 1892. The current coach is Todd Gilcrist, Jr., who took over for Chris Wilkerson.

Key

Coaches

Notes

References

Chicago Maroons

Chicago Maroons